Schau is a surname. Notable people with the surname include:

Justin Schau (born 1998), German footballer
Kristopher Schau (born 1970), Norwegian musician, comedian and radio host
Ryan Schau (born 1975), American football player
Virginia Schau (1915–1989), American photographer

See also 
Schau's Buss, a Norwegian bus company
Schau- und Sichtungsgarten Hermannshof
Schau, lieber Gott, wie meine Feind, BWV 153 ("See, dear God, how my enemies"), BWV 153, a church cantata by Johann Sebastian Bach
Trau, schau, wem! ("Take Care in Whom You Trust!"), Op. 463, a waltz composed by Johann Strauss II
Mach Schau (disambiguation)
Schaus